Escaunets is a commune in the Hautes-Pyrénées department in south-western France.

Together with Séron and Villenave-près-Béarn, the commune forms an enclave of Hautes-Pyrénées within the department of Pyrénées-Atlantiques. A neighbouring second enclave comprises the communes of Gardères and Luquet.

See also
Communes of the Hautes-Pyrénées department

References

Communes of Hautes-Pyrénées
Enclaves and exclaves